A Regional Reserve is a type of protected area used in South Australia that allows the use of natural resources in conjunction with the protected area's conservation function.

Description
Regional reserves are multiple-use protected areas where natural and cultural features can be conserved, but the resources of the reserve can also be used.

History
The category of protected area (known as a “reserve” in South Australia) known as regional reserve was created in 1987 by the South Australian Government in order to achieve a balance between “nature conservation and the use of natural resources.”
The first use of the regional reserve category was the Innamincka Regional Reserve in 1988 which is located in the part of the state containing both a “place of major conservation importance,” the Coongie Lakes wetland system which is listed as a Ramsar site, and primary production activity consisting of petroleum product extraction at Moomba and beef cattle production on the Innamincka Station.
The National Parks and Wildlife Act 1972 was amended in 1987 to create this reserve category along with the additional requirements of seeking Parliamentary approval to abolish or remove land from a regional reserve and the tabling of periodic reporting on a 10-year basis in the Parliament of South Australia. The reporting is twofold - firstly, an assessment of “the impact of the utilisation of natural resources on the conservation of the wildlife and the natural and historic features of the reserve” is required and secondly, an assessment of the benefit achieved by the state economy by the use of the natural resources is required.

List of regional reserves
As of 2014, all of the following regional reserves were classified as IUCN Category VI protected areas.

See also
Protected areas of South Australia

Citations and references

Citations

References

External links
Chowilla Game Reserve and Regional Reserve official webpage
Innamincka Regional Reserve official webpage
Simpson Desert Conservation Park and Regional Reserve official webpage
Yellabinna Regional Reserve official webpage